Diane Poitras (born 1951) is a Canadian video and film artist. 

Her work is included in the collection of the National Gallery of Canada and the Cinematheque quebecoise.

References

21st-century Canadian women artists
1951 births
Living people
21st-century Canadian artists
Canadian video artists
Women video artists